The 1987 Philadelphia mayoral election saw the reelection of Wilson Goode over former mayor Frank Rizzo, who had switched to the Republican Party.

Democratic primary

Candidates

Declared
 Wilson Goode, incumbent Mayor
 Ed Rendell, District Attorney of Philadelphia
 Bernard Salera, perennial candidate

Results

Republican primary

Candidates

Declared
 John Egan, Republican nominee for mayor in 1983
 Frank Rizzo, former Mayor

Results

General election

Results

References

1987
Philadelphia
1987 Pennsylvania elections
1980s in Philadelphia